"Wrap Her Up" is a song by English musician Elton John, released as the second single from his 1985 album, Ice on Fire. George Michael provides backing vocals on the song. The single had limited success worldwide.

It reached number 12 in the UK Singles Chart, number 22 on the Australian Singles Chart, number 26 in Canada on the RPM Top Singles chart and number 20 on the US Billboard Hot 100.

Background
George Michael was quoted at the time in Smash Hits magazine that "it sounded like I had my willy in a garotte" because of the falsetto he sings throughout the song.

The song talks about fashion models as it was notable for the number of famous women's names dropped toward the end, including Kiki Dee, who had duetted with Elton on the hit song "Don't Go Breaking My Heart" in 1976, and also provided background vocals for "Wrap Her Up."  The rest of the list includes (in order) Marlene Dietrich, Marilyn Monroe, Brigitte Bardot, Doris Day, Billie Jean King, Samantha Fox, Joan Collins, Katharine Hepburn, Vivien Leigh, Grace Jones, Priscilla Presley, Vanessa Williams, Dusty Springfield, Nancy Reagan, Rita Hayworth, Madonna (as "Material Girl"), Julie Andrews, Superwoman, Annie Lennox, Mata Hari, Anouska Hempel, Shirley Temple, Tallulah Bankhead, Linda Lovelace, Little Eva, Nastassja Kinski, Princess Caroline of Monaco, Pat Fernandez (a close friend of George Michael who appeared in two Wham! videos), and Elsie Tanner.

"Wrap Her Up" has the longest credit of songwriters on a Elton John song.

Reception
Cash Box called it "a healthy tribute to the girl group’s of yesteryear."  Billboard said it has "shades of Temptations circa 1964."

Music video
A music video was recorded for the song, which was directed by Russell Mulcahy, and featured John and George Michael, as well as Kiki Dee (who gets a custard pie in the face from Elton) and John's backing band. The video was featured in the video compilation version of The Very Best of Elton John in 1990, but the song was not included on any formats of the audio release edition of the compilation. The music video version of the song is abridged, with a running time of 4 minutes 11 seconds, almost two minutes shorter than the album version.

Live performances
This song was heavily performed live during the 1985 leg of Ice On Fire World Tour. On the 1986 leg, John rarely performed this song on the concerts of the same tour.

Personnel 
 Elton John – lead vocals
 George Michael – guest vocals
 Fred Mandel – keyboards, sequencing
 Davey Johnstone – electric guitar, backing vocals
 Paul Westwood – bass
 Charlie Morgan – drums
 Phil Todd – alto saxophone
 David Bitelli – baritone and tenor saxophones, horn arrangements 
 Rick Taylor – trombone
 Raul D'Oliveira – trumpet
 Paul Spong – trumpet
 James Newton Howard – string arrangements
 Kiki Dee – backing vocals
 Katie Kissoon – backing vocals
 Pete Wingfield – backing vocals

References

External links
 

1985 songs
1985 singles
Elton John songs
George Michael songs
Songs with music by Elton John
Songs with lyrics by Bernie Taupin
Song recordings produced by Gus Dudgeon
Geffen Records singles
The Rocket Record Company singles
Music videos directed by Russell Mulcahy
Male vocal duets